Eaton's agar is a type of agar media is used to grow Mycoplasma pneumoniae.

One recipe for the cultivation of M. pneumoniae (Eaton's agar) includes (v/v):
70% Difco PPLO (pleuropneumonia-like organism) agar or broth base
20% unheated horse serum
10% fresh aqueous extract of baker's yeast
1000 units/ml Penicillin G

References

Microbiological media